Below is a list of events affecting Japanese television in 2021.

Events

Ongoing

New series and returning shows

Ending

Sports events

Special events and milestone episodes

Deaths

See also 
 2021 in British television (Brexit)
 2021 in television

References 

2021 in Japanese television